Des Field (born 1 June 1942) is a former Australian rules footballer who played with Collingwood in the Victorian Football League (VFL).

Notes

External links 
 
 
 Des Field 1960, Collingwood Forever.
 Collingwood Senior Team 1960, Boyles Football Photos.

1942 births
Australian rules footballers from Victoria (Australia)
Collingwood Football Club players
Coleraine Football Club players
Living people